Yendoutié Richard Nane (born 23 May 1995) is a Togolese footballer who plays as a forward for Hafia FC and the Togo national team.

Career 
Nane began his career with the Togolese club ASC Kara, before transferring to Guinea with Hafia FC on 5 August 2021.

International career 
Nane made his debut with the Togo national team in a 0–0 2020 African Nations Championship qualification tie with Benin on 28 July 2019.

International goals 
Scores and results list Togo's goal tally first.

References

External links
 
 

1995 births
Living people
Togolese footballers
Togo international footballers
Association football forwards
Hafia FC players
Guinée Championnat National players
Togolese expatriate footballers
Expatriate footballers in Guinea
Togolese expatriates in Guinea
21st-century Togolese people